Triangle is a Star Trek: The Original Series novel written by Sondra Marshak and Myrna Culbreath.

Plot
Both Captain Kirk and Commander Spock have fallen in love with the same woman, Federation Free Agent Sola Than. This situation ties into the galaxy-threatening danger of the immense intelligence known as the 'Totality'.

References

External links

 Triangle at Amazon.com

1983 American novels
1983 science fiction novels
American science fiction novels
Pocket Books books
Books by Myrna Culbreath
Books by Sondra Marshak
Novels based on Star Trek: The Original Series
Collaborative novels